The 1886 Philadelphia Quakers season was a season in American baseball. The Quakers finished in fourth place in the National League with a record of 71–43, 14 games behind the Chicago White Stockings. Arthur Irwin served as team captain.

Regular season

Season standings

Record vs. opponents

Roster

Player stats

Batting

Starters by position 
Note: Pos = Position; G = Games played; AB = At bats; H = Hits; Avg. = Batting average; HR = Home runs; RBI = Runs batted in

Other batters 
Note: G = Games played; AB = At bats; H = Hits; Avg. = Batting average; HR = Home runs; RBI = Runs batted in

Pitching

Starting pitchers 
Note: G = Games pitched; IP = Innings pitched; W = Wins; L = Losses; ERA = Earned run average; SO = Strikeouts

Relief pitchers 
Note: G = Games pitched; W = Wins; L = Losses; SV = Saves; ERA = Earned run average; SO = Strikeouts

References 

1886 Philadelphia Quakers season at Baseball Reference

Philadelphia Phillies seasons
Philadelphia Phillies season
Philadelphia